Bahia ambrosioides is a  South American species of flowering plants in the family Asteraceae. It is native to Chile including the Juan Fernández Islands.

References

ambrosioides
Flora of Chile
Plants described in 1816